Lane is a  cryptographic hash function submitted to the NIST hash function competition; it was designed by Sebastiaan Indesteege with contributions by Elena Andreeva, Christophe De Cannière, Orr Dunkelman, Emilia Käsper, Svetla Nikova, Bart Preneel and Elmar Tischhauser.  It re-uses many components from AES in a custom construction.  The authors claim performance of up to 25.66 cycles per byte on an Intel Core 2 Duo.

External links 
 The Lane web site

NIST hash function competition